Moqam Rural District is a rural district (dehestan) in the Shibkaveh District of Bandar Lengeh County, Hormozgan Province, Iran. At the 2006 census, its population was 6,227, in 1,113 families.  The rural district has 19 villages.

References 

Rural Districts of Hormozgan Province
Bandar Lengeh County